Junk Island may refer to:
Pulau Jong, an island in Singapore
Fat Tong Chau, a former island in Hong Kong
Junk, a tiny island near Hoy, Shetland in Scotland